{{Infobox venue
| stadium_name      = Al-Hamadaniah Stadium ملعب الحمدانية
| nickname          = 
| image             =Al-Hamadaniya stad Aleppo1.jpg
| location          = Aleppo, Syria
| built             = 1982 to 1986
| opened            = 1986, 2021 (reopened)
| closed            = 
| demolished        = 
| owner             = Government of Syria
| operator          = General Sports Federation of Syria
| surface           = Grass
| dimensions        = 
| construction_cost = 
| architect         = 
| former_names      = 
| tenants           = Al-Ittihad SCAl-Hurriya SCAfrin SC
| seating_capacity  = 15,000
| }}Al-Hamadaniah Stadium is an all-seater multi-purpose stadium in Aleppo, Syria. It is mostly used for football matches and has a capacity of 15,000 spectators. Al-Hamadaniah Stadium is part of the Al-Hamadaniah Sports City'''. Since 2007, the stadium is served by a nearby artificial turf-football training ground with a capacity of 816 seats.

The stadium serves as a home ground for Hurriya SC and sometimes for Al-Ittihad Aleppo as well. It hosted many of Syria national football team's matches before the inauguration of Aleppo International Stadium, which is near Al-Hamadaniah Stadium.

The venue can also stage athletics tournaments with its up-to-date track and field facilities.

History
As part of the Al-Hamadaniah Sports City, the construction of the stadium was launched in 1982. It was completed and opened in 1986 to host the football competition of the 1987 Mediterranean Games. In 1992, it was the main venue of the football competition at the 7th Pan Arab Games. The competition also counted as the FIFA Arab Cup.

The stadium was the regular home ground of the Syria national football team during the 1990s.

The original capacity of the stadium was 25,000. However, after the renovation in 2008, it was turned into an all-seater stadium and the capacity was reduced to 15,000.

During the Syrian civil war, the stadium suffered heavy damages while the playing surface was entirely deteriorated. However, in 2020, the stadium has been renovated,  with the installment of new turf and the placement of new red-colored seats.

See also
List of football stadiums in Syria

References

Sports venues completed in 1986
Football venues in Syria
Athletics (track and field) venues in Syria
Sports venues in Aleppo
1986 establishments in Syria